Baron Walsingham, of Walsingham in the County of Norfolk, is a title in the Peerage of Great Britain.

This noble title was created in 1780 for Sir William de Grey on his retirement as Lord Chief Justice, who had previously served as Solicitor-General and as Attorney-General. His son, the second Baron, represented Wareham, Tamworth and Lostwithiel in the House of Commons and served as Joint Postmaster-General from 1787 to 1794; Lord Walsingham was also Chairman of Committees in the House of Lords for many years. His eldest son, the third Baron, was a Lieutenant-General in the Army, who was succeeded by his younger brother, the Archdeacon of Surrey, as fourth Baron. His grandson, the sixth Baron, was a Conservative Member of Parliament for Norfolk West and served as a Government Whip from 1874 to 1875 in Benjamin Disraeli's second administration. On his death the title passed to his half-brother, the seventh Baron, a barrister.

In 1929, his son Lieutenant-Colonel George de Grey succeeded as eighth Baron; he was appointed DSO, OBE and OStJ. His only son, Captain John de Grey MC, succeeded as the ninth and present Baron in 1965.

Ancestors
William de Grey (d. 1687), Member of Parliament for Thetford 1685
Thomas de Grey (1680-1765), Member of Parliament for Norfolk 1715–1727
Thomas de Grey (1717-1781), Member of Parliament for Norfolk 1764-1774;

Barons Walsingham (1780)
William de Grey, 1st Baron Walsingham (1719–1781)
Thomas de Grey, 2nd Baron Walsingham (1748–1818)
George de Grey, 3rd Baron Walsingham (1776–1831)
Thomas de Grey, 4th Baron Walsingham (1778–1839)
Thomas de Grey, 5th Baron Walsingham (1804–1870)
Thomas de Grey, 6th Baron Walsingham (1843–1919)
John Augustus de Grey, 7th Baron Walsingham (1849–1929)
George de Grey, 8th Baron Walsingham (1884–1965)
John de Grey, 9th Baron Walsingham (b. 1925)

The heir apparent is the present holder's son Hon. Robert de Grey (b. 1969)
The heir apparent's heir apparent is his son Thomas de Grey (b. 1997)

See also 
 House of Grey
 Sir Roger de Grey

References

Bibliography 
 
 
 

Baronies in the Peerage of Great Britain
Grey family
People from Walsingham
1780s introductions
Noble titles created in 1780